Nudes of the World is a 1961 British naturist film. It was also known as Nudes of All Nations.

References

External links
Nudes of the World at IMDb

British drama films
Nudity in film
1960s English-language films